Patricia Hilliard (14 March 1916 – 19 May 2001), born Patricia Maud Penn-Gaskell, was a British stage and film actress.

Biography
She was born at Quetta, then in British India, now in Pakistan, on 14 March 1916. She was the daughter of actress Ann Codrington (real name Marjorie Doris Codrington, who appeared in films such as The Rossiter Case) and her first husband, Percy Charles Penn-Gaskell, a military. Hilliard later adopted the last name of her stepfather, actor Stafford Hilliard. In December 1915, her mother, while pregnant with Patricia, and her grandmother, Mrs. Helen Codrington, were aboard the British passenger liner  when it was sunk by a German submarine in the Mediterranean. Ann Codrington was one of only 15 surviving women; Helen Codrington did not survive.

Hilliard attended the Royal Academy of Dramatic Art in London, where her performance in Molière's Sicilien and her striking beauty led to a 2-year contract with Warner Brothers. After some modelling she appeared as an extra in Double Wedding (1933). She rapidly progressed, being the female lead in The Girl in the Crowd (1935) and René Clair's The Ghost Goes West (1935). She also appeared in Alexander Korda's Things to Come, based on H. G. Wells's novel. Her film career tailed off, but she continued to work on stage.

She married actor William Fox in 1938, with whom she had appeared on stage in William Congreve's Love for Love and the first production of J B Priestley's I Have Been Here Before (1937). She took a break between 1940 and 1944 following the birth of her first child and while her husband was on active military service in World War II, returning to the stage in 1944. In 1952 she joined the BBC's repertory company, before retiring in the early 1960s.

Filmography

References

Bibliography
 Low, Rachael. History of the British Film, 1918–1929. George Allen & Unwin, 1971.

External links
 

1916 births
2001 deaths
British film actresses
British stage actresses
British people in colonial India